The B.E.S.T. Academy at Benjamin S. Carson (BEST) was opened in Atlanta, Georgia, United States in August 2007. For a short time the academy was simply referred to as "the boys' single gender academy," but was later named by its first principal, Curt R. Green, in honor of the renowned neurosurgeon Dr. Benjamin S. Carson.  B.E.S.T. is an acronym for Business, Engineering, Science, and Technology.

At its inception, the school served boys in grade 6 with plans for expansion to grade 12 by 2013. The B.E.S.T. Academy is a public school in the Atlanta Public Schools system.

Single-gender education
The B.E.S.T. academy was initiated by Atlanta Public Schools based on the research of Michael Gurian, who asserts that girls and boys have different learning styles. To this effect, teachers at B.E.S.T. employ teaching strategies that are geared toward the general learning styles of boys.

Curriculum
The students at B.E.S.T. are immersed in an academic curriculum which includes language arts, social studies, reading, math, and science.

Connections
Students at BEST have an opportunity to take various connections classes. These include:
 Art
 Band
 Business Education and Computer Technology 
 Chorus 
 Heath & Physical Education
 Sex Ed
 Spanish
 Strings

Extracurricular activities
The following extracurricular activities are offered at B.E.S.T.:

 Afterschool Allstars 
 Baseball
 Basketball
 Cross Country
 Debate team
 Football
 JROTC
 Robotics
 Swimming
 Track and field
 Fencing

Further reading
 Thomas-Whitfield, Chandra. "B.E.S.T. Men: Atlanta’s All-Male Academy Seeks To Close Achievement Gap." Juvenile Justice Information Exchange. January 3, 2011.

External links
 BEST Academy

Boys' schools in the United States
Educational institutions established in 2007
Middle schools in Atlanta
Atlanta Public Schools high schools
Atlanta Public Schools schools
Public middle schools in Georgia (U.S. state)
2007 establishments in Georgia (U.S. state)